Edward Morrone is an American politician who was a Senator in the State of Rhode Island representing the 51st District.

References

Rhode Island state senators
Living people
Year of birth missing (living people)
Place of birth missing (living people)